Keno is a lottery-like or bingo-like gambling game.

Keno may also refer to:
Keno (name), a male name of Germanic/Frisian origin

Places 
Keno, Michigan, an unincorporated community in Roscommon County, Michigan, United States
Keno, Oregon, an unincorporated community in Klamath County, Oregon, United States
Keno City, Yukon, a small community in the Yukon at the end of the Silver Trail highway
Keno Province, an ancient region of Japan in eastern Honshu

Other uses 
KENO (AM), a sports/talk AM radio station in Las Vegas, Nevada
SS Keno, sternwheel paddle steamer that worked on the Yukon River and its tributaries, now preserved as a National Historic Site of Canada